Southend East was a parliamentary constituency in Essex.  It returned one Member of Parliament (MP)  to the House of Commons of the Parliament of the United Kingdom.

History
The constituency was created for the 1950 general election under the Representation of the People Act 1948, when the Parliamentary Borough of Southend-on-Sea was split in two.  It was abolished for the 1997 general election when it was replaced by Rochford and Southend East.

Southend East was a mostly safe Conservative seat throughout its existence, although their majority was only just over 500 votes in 1966, and at the by-election in 1980 when the Conservatives held the seat by only 430 votes. From this by-election until its abolition, Southend East was held by the Conservative Teddy Taylor.

Boundaries and boundary changes
1950–1955: The County Borough of Southend-on-Sea wards of All Saints, Pier, Shoebury, Southchurch, and Thorpe, and the Rural District of Rochford.

Formed primarily from eastern parts of the abolished Parliamentary Borough of Southend-on-Sea.  The Rural District of Rochford and the former Urban District of Shoeburyness (which had been absorbed by the County Borough of Southend-on-Sea) had previously been part of the abolished South-Eastern Division of Essex.

1955–1983: The County Borough of Southend-on-Sea wards of All Saints, Milton, Pier, Shoebury, Southchurch, Temple Sutton, Thorpe and Victoria.

Realignment of boundary with Southend West. The Rural District of Rochford transferred back to the re-established constituency of South East Essex.

1983–1997: The Borough of Southend-on-Sea wards of Milton, St Luke's, Shoebury, Southchurch, Thorpe, and Victoria.

Marginal changes following the redistribution of wards in the Borough of Southend-on-Sea.

The constituency included Southend town centre, and parts of the Borough of Southend to the east.

In 1997, Southend East was abolished and expanded to the north to include the town of Rochford once again, forming the new constituency of Rochford and Southend East.

Members of Parliament

Elections

Elections in the 1950s

Elections in the 1960s

Elections in the 1970s

Elections in the 1980s

Elections in the 1990s

See also
List of parliamentary constituencies in Essex

Notes and references

Parliamentary constituencies in Essex (historic)
Politics of Southend-on-Sea
Constituencies of the Parliament of the United Kingdom established in 1950
Constituencies of the Parliament of the United Kingdom disestablished in 1997